Tripoline  is a type of ribbon pasta noodles, similar to mafaldine. It is a thick ribbon ridged on one side.

In the 1930s, Fascist Italy celebrated its colonial empire by creating new forms of pasta reminiscent of its African possessions: tripoline (Tripoli), bengazine (Benghazi), assabesi (Assab) and abissine (Abyssinia). Subsequently, in order to erase the references to colonialist fascism, the tripoline are renamed farfalline (small butterflies).

References

Types of pasta